Corrientes (Guaraní: Taragüí, literally: "Currents") is the capital city of the province of Corrientes, Argentina, located on the eastern shore of the Paraná River, about  from Buenos Aires and  from Posadas, on National Route 12. It has a population of 346,334 according to the 2010 Census. It lies opposite its twin city, Resistencia, Chaco.

Corrientes has a mix of colonial and modern architecture, several churches and a number of lapacho, ceibo, jacaranda and orange trees. It is also home to one of the biggest carnival and chamamé celebrations in the country.

Transportation 

Located in the Argentine Littoral, near the Argentina–Paraguay border, the General Belgrano Bridge crosses the Paraná River which serves as the natural border with the neighbouring Chaco Province. On the other side of the bridge is Resistencia, capital of Chaco. To the west and up the Paraná, between Paraguay and Argentina, lies the Yaciretá dam, one of the largest hydroelectric power generators in the world.

The Ferrocarril Económico Correntino narrow gauge railway line to Mburucuyá operated from 1912 until 1927.

History 

Sebastian Cabot established in 1527 the Sancti Spiritu fort upstream of the Paraná River, and in 1536 Pedro de Mendoza reached further north into the basin of the river, searching for the Sierras of Silver.

Juan Torres de Vera y Aragón founded the city on April 3, 1588 and named it as San Juan de Vera de las Siete Corrientes ("Saint John of Vera of the Seven Currents"), which was later shortened to Corrientes. The "seven currents" refer to the seven peninsulas on the shore of the river at this place, that produced wild currents that made difficult the navigation of the river through this part.

Nevertheless, its position between Asunción - in present Paraguay - and Buenos Aires made it an important middle point, especially because of its 55-metre-high lands that prevent flooding when the water level rises.

In 1615 Jesuits settled near the Uruguay River. In 1807 the city resisted the British invasions. During the Argentine War of Independence it was in permanent conflict with the centralist government of Buenos Aires, but the Paraguayan War united them after the city was attacked by Paraguayan forces in 1865.

Climate 
The Köppen climate classification subtype for this climate is Cfa (humid subtropical climate). Frosts are rare; with the dates of the first and last frost being July 5 and July 12 respectively, indicating that most of the year is frost-free.

Education 
 National University of the Northeast
 University of Cuenca del Plata

Sister cities

Corrientes is twinned with:

 Encarnación, Paraguay 
 Estepa, Spain

In fiction 
The Graham Greene spy novel The Honorary Consul (1973) takes place in Corrientes.

Gallery

Sports
The city's main football teams are the: Huracán Corrientes, Boca Unidos, and Deportivo Mandiyú.

See also 

Barrio Esperanza

References

External links 
  MCC 
 
 Sights (English)
 Map

 
Populated places established in 1588
Populated places in Corrientes Province
Capitals of Argentine provinces
Paraná River
Cities in Argentina
Argentina
Corrientes Province